The Georgia national baseball team is the national baseball team of Georgia. The team competes in the bi-annual European Baseball Championship.

External links
 Georgia: Baseball in Tbilisi No Field of Dreams

National baseball teams in Europe
Baseball